The Ulsan-class frigate (Hangul: 울산급 호위함, Hanja: 蔚山級護衛艦) is the high-end complement of the high-low mix domestic naval construction plan of the Republic of Korea Navy under the 1st Yulgok Project (1974–1986) for the Republic of Korea Armed Forces.

Design 
The Ulsan class is a light frigate built by Hyundai Heavy Industries and Daewoo Shipbuilding & Marine Engineering.

Ships in class

Foreign variant

Bangladesh Navy 

In June 2001, the Bangladesh Navy commissioned a frigate based on the Ulsan-class frigate but the design was heavily modified. She is the most modern ship in her fleet.

See also
 List of active Republic of Korea Navy ships
 List of naval ship classes in service

References

 
Frigate classes